was a town located in Kitaakita District, Akita Prefecture, Japan.

On March 22, 2005, Moriyoshi, along with the towns of Aikawa, Ani and Takanosu (all from Kitaakita District), merged to create the city of Kitaakita.

References

External links
 Kitaakita official website 

Dissolved municipalities of Akita Prefecture
Kitaakita